Bobby Kottarakkara (11 March 1952 – 3 December 2000) was an Indian actor who acted in Malayalam films. He was born to Pareedkunju Ravuthar in Kottarakkara. He began his acting career on stage. He made his film debut with Mucheettukalikkaarante Makal. Bobby soon became a well-known actor. He performed in around 300 roles in a variety of films, some of which are such as Mazhavilkavadi, Kannezhuthi Pottum Thottu, Golanthara Vartha, Kaazhchakkappuram and Chithram. He also acted in several TV serials.

It was during the filming of Vakkalathu Narayanankutty that Bobby died of a massive heart attack in December 2000. The film had Jayaram and Mukesh in the main roles and was released a few months after his death.

Filmography

References

External links

Bobby Kottarakkara at MSI

1952 births
2000 deaths
Male actors from Kollam
Indian male film actors
Male actors in Malayalam cinema
Indian male television actors
20th-century Indian male actors
21st-century Indian male actors